Tracey Johnson is an American former Negro league second baseman who played in the 1930s.

Johnson played for the Washington Black Senators in 1938. In eight recorded games, he posted eight hits in 32 plate appearances.

References

External links
 and Seamheads

Year of birth missing
Place of birth missing
Washington Black Senators players